Leutkirch station is the station of the town of Leutkirch im Allgäu in the German state of Baden-Württemberg. It is classified by Deutsche Bahn as a category 5 station and has two platform tracks. The station is located on the network of the Bodensee-Oberschwaben Verkehrsverbund (Lake Constance-Upper Swabia Transport Association, bodo) and belongs to fare zone 68. The address of the station is Bahnhof 1. 
 
The station was opened on 1 September 1872 as the terminus of the Württemberg Allgäu Railway. On 14 August 1874, with the opening of the line to Isny, it became a through station. In preparation for the opening of the line to Memmingen on 2 October 1889 when Leutkirch became a railway junction, the current station building was built between the diverging tracks.

History

The station was opened on 1 September 1872 as a terminus with the opening of the Kißlegg to Leutkirch section of the Württemberg Allgäu Railway. The temporary station building was opened with a floor area of 27 × 10 metres. The wooden, one-storey building had rooms for the post office, railway service rooms and two waiting rooms.

On 14 August 1874, it became a through station with the opening of line to Isny. In preparation for the opening of the line to Memmingen on 2 October 1889 when Leutkirch became a railway junction, the current station building was built as a “wedge station” (German: Keilbahnhof) between the diverging tracks.

Leutkirch became a through station again on 31 December 2001 when the line to Isny was closed. The station building is listed as a historical monument and was restored between 2011 and 2012. The costs involved were financed by the town and a cooperative of 600 citizens who provided €1 million. The town station was declared as the "Monument of the Month” in April 2012 by the Memorial Foundation of Baden-Württemberg.

Operations

Long distance services
On 27 May 1979, the first express train was introduced on the Munich–Memmingen–Lindau route. A pair of trains (numbered 366/367) ran from Munich via Lindau and Zürich Airport to Milan, stopping in Wangen and Leutkirch. The express train was formed of a class 218 locomotive hauling modern carriages, but it was withdrawn in May 1982. Since the mid-1980s, a EuroCity service has operated on line 88 on the Munich–Zürich route through the station without stopping; they only stop between Buchloe and Lindau in Memmingen.

Regional services

The station is served every two hours by two services operated by Go-Ahead Bayern, the RE 96 (Munich–Leutkirch–Lindau) and the RB 92 (Memmingen–Leutkirch–Lindau-Insel). Additionally Leutkirch is served every two hours by the RB 53 to/from Aulendorf, operated by DB Regio.

Notes

References

External links

  
   
 

Railway stations in Baden-Württemberg
Railway stations in Germany opened in 1872